Polovinny (masculine), Polovinnaya (feminine), or Polovinnoye (neuter) is the name of several rural localities in Russia:
Polovinny, Nizhny Novgorod Oblast, a pochinok in Gorevsky Selsoviet of Urensky District of Nizhny Novgorod Oblast
Polovinny, Kirovgrad, Sverdlovsk Oblast, a settlement under the administrative jurisdiction of the Town of Kirovgrad, Sverdlovsk Oblast
Polovinny, Verkhnyaya Pyshma, Sverdlovsk Oblast, a settlement under the administrative jurisdiction of the Town of Verkhnyaya Pyshma, Sverdlovsk Oblast
Polovinnoye, Polovinsky District, Kurgan Oblast, a selo in Polovinsky Selsoviet of Polovinsky District of Kurgan Oblast
Polovinnoye, Tselinny District, Kurgan Oblast, a selo in Polovinsky Selsoviet of Tselinny District of Kurgan Oblast
Polovinnoye, Barabinsky District, Novosibirsk Oblast, a village in Barabinsky District, Novosibirsk Oblast
Polovinnoye, Krasnozyorsky District, Novosibirsk Oblast, a selo in Krasnozyorsky District, Novosibirsk Oblast
Polovinnoye, Tyumen Oblast, a selo in Zaroslovsky Rural Okrug of Berdyuzhsky District of Tyumen Oblast
Polovinnaya, Irkutsk Oblast, a settlement in Slyudyansky District of Irkutsk Oblast
Polovinnaya, Nizhny Novgorod Oblast, a village in Khmelevitsky Selsoviet of Shakhunya, Nizhny Novgorod Oblast